Santo Pietro is a small village (frazione) of the Comune of Caltagirone, Sicily, Italy, with a population of c. 90 people.

History
The settlement was founded as Mussolinia di Sicilia, one of several settlements across Italy founded by the fascist government of Benito Mussolini. In 1943 during World War II, this was one of the sites of the Biscari massacre, the massacre of 73 Axis soldiers altogether. The current name was adopted after World War II.

Frazioni of the Province of Catania
Planned cities
Italian fascist architecture
Populated places established in 1924